Vahdat Rural District is a rural district (dehestan) in Mugarmun District, Landeh County, Kohgiluyeh and Boyer-Ahmad Province, Iran. At the 2006 census, its population was 1,576, in 294 families. The rural district was established in 2012. The rural district has 19 villages.

References 

Rural Districts of Kohgiluyeh and Boyer-Ahmad Province
Landeh County
2012 establishments in Iran